Holocraspedon is a genus of moths in the family Erebidae first described by George Hampson in 1893.

Description
Palpi porrect (extending forward) and reaching beyond the frons. Antennae ciliated in male. Forewings with veins 4 and 5 from angle of cell. Vein 6 from below upper angle. Veins 7, 8 and 9, 10 stalked. Hindwings with veins 4 and 5 from angle of cell. Veins 6 and 7 stalked whereas vein 8 from near end of cell.

Species
 Holocraspedon bilineata (Hampson, 1901)
 Holocraspedon erkunin (Pagenstecher, 1886)
 Holocraspedon flava (van Eecke, 1927)
 Holocraspedon mediopuncta (Rothschild, 1913)
 Holocraspedon nigropunctum Hampson, 1893
 Holocraspedon parallelum (Semper, 1899)
 Holocraspedon vaneeckei Holloway, 2001

Former species
 Holocraspedon hypopolius (Rothschild, 1916)

References

External links

Lithosiini
Moth genera